The Life of a Song may refer to:
 The Life of a Song (Joey + Rory album)
 The Life of a Song (Geri Allen album)